Workers' Institute may refer to:

 Cradley Heath Workers' Institute, a museum building in the English West Midlands
 Miners' institute or mechanics' institute, buildings constructed for workers' education and meetings
 Workers' Institute of Marxism–Leninism–Mao Zedong Thought, a former English Maoist group